Kala Krishna (born November 26, 1956 New Delhi, India) is an Indian -American economist, currently   Liberal Arts Research Professor of Economics at Pennsylvania State University., an NBER Research Associate and a CESifo Research Network Fellow. Her research is in the areas  of international trade, economics of education, development economics and industrial organization.

Biography 
Krishna was born on  November 26, 1956 in New Delhi, India. She holds B.A. in economics (1976) from Lady Shriram College at Delhi University and M.A. (1978) in Economics from Delhi School of Economics. Kala Krishna received her Ph.D. in economics from Princeton University in 1984.

Her academic career started as an assistant professor (1984–1988) and then   associate professor (1988–1991) at Harvard University. In 1991–1993, she became  William L Clayton Professor of Economics at the Fletcher School of Law and Diplomacy at Tufts University. Since 1993, Kala Krishna is a professor of economics at Pennsylvania State University.

Selected publications

Most cited journal articles 
As of October 2019, the RePEc ranking of authors of Economics research papers lists Kala Krishna among the top 5% of economists

 Krishna, K., Lychagin, S., & Frisancho, V. (2018). Retaking in High Stakes Exams: Is Less More?. International Economic Review, 59(2), 449–477.
 Krishna, K., & Sheveleva, Y. (2017). Wheat or strawberries? Intermediated trade with limited contracting. American Economic Journal: Microeconomics, 9(3), 28–62.
 Kee, H. L., & Krishna, K. (2008). Firm-level heterogeneous productivity and demand shocks: Evidence from Bangladesh. The American Economic Review, 98(2), 457–62.
 Imai, S., & Krishna, K. (2004). Employment, deterrence, and crime in a dynamic model. International Economic Review, 45(3), 845–872.
 Krishna, K., & Winston, T. (2003). If at First You Don't Succeed...: Profits, Prices, and Market Structure in a Model of Quality with Unknowable Consumer Heterogeneity. International Economic Review, 44(2), 573–597.
 Krishna, K., & Tan, L. H. (1999). Transferable licenses versus nontransferable licenses: what is the difference?. International Economic Review, 40(3), 785–800.
 Krishna, K. (1993). Auctions with endogenous valuations: the persistence of monopoly revisited. The American Economic Review, 147–160.
 Krishna, K. (1990). The Case of the Vanishing Revenues: Auction Quotas with Monopoly. The American Economic Review, 80(4), 828–836. According to Google Scholar, this article has been cited 578 times. ]
 Krishna, K. (1989). Trade restrictions as facilitating practices. Journal of International Economics, 26(3–4), 251–270.

Books 
Krishna, K., & Tan, L. H. (1998). Rags and riches: Implementing apparel quotas under the multi-fibre arrangement. University of Michigan Press.

External links 

 Biography page at the Pennsylvania State University
 
 Personal website

References 



Living people
1956 births
Lady Shri Ram College alumni
Pennsylvania State University faculty
Harvard University faculty
Delhi School of Economics alumni
Tufts University faculty
American economists